Paul Richard Draper has been Dean of Lismore since 2009.

He was born in 1964, educated at the University of Glasgow and ordained in 1991.   After a curacy at Drumragh he was the incumbent at Ballydehob from 1994 until 2009.

References

1964 births
Alumni of the University of Glasgow
Deans of Lismore
Living people